Chatham Island (Spanish: Isla Chatham) is an island in the Magallanes Region, Chile.

Cape Charles is the southwest point of Chatham Island, and is the most prominent of the many headlands in that vicinity. The cape is high, rugged, and barren.

See also
 List of islands of Chile

External links
 Islands of Chile @ United Nations Environment Programme
 World island information @ WorldIslandInfo.com
 South America Island High Points above 1000 meters
 United States Hydrographic Office, South America Pilot (1916)

Islands of Magallanes Region